Mexytocerus is a genus of moth in the family Lecithoceridae. It contains the species Mexytocerus enigmaticus, which is found in Madagascar.

References

Natural History Museum Lepidoptera genus database

Lecithoceridae
Monotypic moth genera